, also known outside Japan as Tonikawa: Over the Moon for You, is a Japanese manga series written and illustrated by Kenjiro Hata. It has been serialized in Shogakukan's shōnen manga magazine Weekly Shōnen Sunday since February 2018, with its chapters collected in 22 tankōbon volumes as of December 2022. The story surrounds around the teenage genius Nasa Yuzaki and his developing relationship with his new wife, Tsukasa, who saves him from a traffic accident during the beginning of the story. In North America, the manga is licensed by Viz Media. An anime television series adaptation produced by Seven Arcs aired from October to December 2020 on Tokyo MX and other channels. A second season is set to premiere in April 2023.

Premise 
On a snowy winter night, Nasa Yuzaki, a boy who was made fun of during his childhood because of his peculiar name, encounters a beautiful girl after he received his practice exam grades for high school. When he tries to approach her, he gets hit by a truck due to his lack of attention. However, the girl saves him, and Nasa miraculously follows her at a bus stop and proceeds to confess his love for her. The girl, Tsukasa Tsukuyomi, agrees to become his girlfriend, but only if they are married first. Nasa quickly agrees to her demand and then passes out, waking up in a hospital. Nasa becomes heartbroken when he cannot find her again, until his 18th birthday, where Tsukasa suddenly shows up at his doorstep. Tsukasa goes inside with a marriage form, starting their relationship and their marriage.

Characters

An everyday genius, Nasa grew up ridiculed for his strange name, similar to the American space agency NASA, although his parents meant for his name to reference the starry sky. He has a meeting with fate when he was caught in a terrible accident but was saved by Tsukasa. Declaring his love for her, on the day they met, Tsukasa agrees on the condition that he marries her to which Nasa immediately responded with an unshakable "yes". Two years later, Nasa reunites with Tsukasa carrying a marriage form which they turn in to the bureau, legalizing their relationship. Since marrying her, he becomes incredibly awkward around her, somewhat clingy to an extent because he is worried she would disappear on him again, but does his best to make her happy.

After saving Nasa, she agrees to his confession only if he will marry her. Disappearing for two years, she returns to Nasa's side with the paperwork necessary to legalize their relationship. During the early chapters, she makes a point of the legal name change she underwent upon becoming Nasa's spouse, initially teasing him with her now being named Tsukasa Yuzaki. After she marries Nasa, she begins showing new parts of herself, such as her massive love for movies and manga. She also does not like the idea of spending a lot of money for necessities. Later on, her thoughts while observing Nasa makes it clear she loves him for being such a pure hearted, kind soul. When Tsukasa got to meet Nasa's parents, his father privately thanked her for saving his life as both gave their blessings to their newlywed life. Throughout the story, layers upon layers of mystery are laid upon her and there have been many comparisons of her similarities to Princess Kaguya. The mystery is finally resolved with the revelation that she is the daughter of a character from that story, given immortal life through the elixir of immortality which her father was ordered to burn.

Nasa's junior and the primary caretaker of the Arisagawa public bathhouse, she is the most explicit supporter of Nasa's relationship to the point where she educates both Nasa and Tsukasa in ways of advancing their relationship as well as attempting to forcefully create situations with the same goal of relationship advancement in mind.

Nasa's classmate and a complete airhead, she has explicit feelings for Nasa. However, she understands the circumstances, fully supporting his relationship with Tsukasa.

An adopted relative of Tsukasa, whom she regards as her sister. She jealously disapproves of the marriage and orders her maids Aurora and Charlotte to discredit Nasa. Until learning of the marriage, she regarded Nasa much more kindly. Her actual relation to Tsukasa is not yet clear, though both share a grand aunt, Tokiko.

One of Chitose's maids.

One of Chitose's maids.

Media

Manga
Fly Me to the Moon is written and illustrated by Kenjiro Hata, the author of the manga series Hayate the Combat Butler. He had previously announced his desire to create a new series in November 2016. Fly Me to the Moon  started its serialization in the 2018 12th issue of Shogakukan's Weekly Shōnen Sunday, with a two-chapter debut on February 14, 2018. Shogakukan has collected its chapters into individual tankōbon volumes, with the first one published on May 18, 2018. With the release of its second volume on August 17, 2018, a teaser video was released for Fly Me to the Moon featuring Japanese musical group Earphones. As of December 16, 2022, twenty-two volumes have been published.

In February 2020, Viz Media announced that they licensed the manga for an English release. The first volume was published on September 8, 2020. As of 13 September 2022, thirteen volumes have been released.

A fanbook, titled , was released on December 18, 2020.

Volume list

Anime
An anime television series adaptation was announced on March 4, 2020. The series was produced by Seven Arcs and directed by Hiroshi Ikehata, with Kazuho Hyodo writing the scripts, Masakatsu Sasaki designing the characters, and Endō composing the music. It ran for 12 episodes from October 3 to December 19, 2020 on Tokyo MX, ytv and BS-NTV. Akari Kitō, as her character Tsukasa Yuzaki, performed the opening theme , while KanoeRana performed the ending theme .

Crunchyroll streamed the series in selective territories as part of its Crunchyroll Originals label. In Southeast Asia, Plus Media Networks Asia has licensed the series and they aired it on Aniplus Asia. On November 11, 2020, Crunchyroll announced that the series would receive an English dub, which premiered on November 20.

On December 19, 2020, it was announced that the series would receive an original video animation (OVA), which was released on August 18, 2021. On November 6, 2021, it was announced that the series would have a new episode and a second season, with the staff and cast returning to reprise their respective roles.  The new episode, titled "Seifuku", was originally scheduled to be streamed on Crunchyroll in Q3 2022, but was delayed to November 22, 2022. The second season is set to premiere on April 8, 2023. Kitō, as Tsukasa Yuzaki, will return to perform the opening theme , as well the ending theme .

Episode list

Reception
The manga had over 250,000 copies in circulation as of October 2018, over 400,000 copies in circulation as of February 2019, and over 1 million copies in circulation as of October 2019. , the manga had over 4 million copies in circulation.

In 2019, Fly Me to the Moon was one of the winners of the 5th Next Manga Award in the Print category.

Notes

References

Further reading

External links
 
 

Anime series based on manga
Crunchyroll Originals
Kaguya-hime
Marriage in anime and manga
Romantic comedy anime and manga
Science fiction anime and manga
Seven Arcs
Shogakukan manga
Shōnen manga
Slice of life anime and manga
Tokyo MX original programming
Upcoming anime television series
Viz Media manga